Quick Before They Catch Us was a 1966 British action/adventure children's television series. It starred then child actors Pamela Franklin, Teddy Green and David Griffin as three teenagers who become amateur detectives in Swinging London during the mid-1960s. Although the series was short-lived, all three stars went on to have long and successful television careers in both the United Kingdom and the United States. Its theme song, written and performed by Brian Epstein's Paddy, Klaus and Gibson, later became a popular tune and one of the group's first hits after releasing it as a single.

Plot
The series concerns the adventures of three London teenagers: Kate (Pamela Franklin), Johnny Martin (Teddy Green) and Mark Dennison (David Griffin), who use their unique talents to solve crimes in their neighbourhood. Kate, the youngest of the three, possessed a photographic memory and was a talented artist; as well as a sketch artist, she most often trailed suspects. Johnny was a technology student and often built surveillance equipment and other inventive gadgets. Mark (David Griffin) was the "nerdy" bookworm of the group, arguably the most intelligent of the three, and was the photographer.

Kate works part-time as a waitress at a café. She is approached by several suspicious men who wish to rent her attic room. The men offer to pay her at first, but then intimidate her until she reluctantly agrees to rent them the room. She befriends Johnny Martin, a mechanic who works at a nearby garage, and photography student Mark Dennison. Kate remains suspicious of her new tenants. With the help of her new friends, she exposes a real estate agent who was using the camera obscura in the attic room to spy on local tenants and blackmail them.

In their second adventure ("Mark Of Distinction"), Mark stops a purse snatcher who inadvertently leads the three friends to uncover a plan to steal a valuable stamp collection. While vacationing on the southern coast of England, the three friends are drawn into a naval plot after Mark snaps an odd-looking photograph. In their last adventure they start a band. Performing at the opening night of the "Big A" nightclub, they find out that someone is planning to steal a picture from the club as part of an art fraud scheme.

History
In the summer of 1966, BBC Television commissioned a replacement series for Dixon of Dock Green during that show's summer hiatus. Five writers – N. J. Crisp, George F. Kerr, Jack Trevor Story, Margot Bennett and John Gray – were hired to create an action serial for children and teenagers. Pamela Franklin, Teddy Green and David Griffin were cast in the lead roles. Green and Griffin had previously guest starred on Dixon of Dock Green.

Each screenwriter wrote one four-episode story. The first story was written by Crisp who, at the time of the series, had written over a dozen original television plays and was a regular contributor for Doctor Finlay's Casebook and Dixon Of Dock Green.

The production crew included Richard Martin, Derek Martinus, Morris Barry and Paddy Russell, all of whom also directed stories for Doctor Who. Barry Newbery, Peter Kindred and Oliver Bayldon worked on the series as set designers.

Reception
The first episode aired on 7 May 1966 in an early Saturday evening timeslot. The Radio Times promoted the show during the first few weeks on the air, and the series appealed to the younger audiences of the 1960s. Although the series received high ratings throughout its run, the series was not renewed. Its final episode was aired on 24 September 1966, and was replaced by the returning Dixon Of Dock Green.

The series theme song was performed by Paddy, Klaus and Gibson, a Liverpool-based group managed by Brian Epstein.  It was released as the B side of their third and final single (on Pye 7N 17112 in the UK).

All three stars went on to have successful film and television careers. Franklin later moved to the United States where she guest starred in numerous American television series such as Hawaii Five-O, Police Woman, Fantasy Island and Vega$. Griffin remained in the UK where he became a regular on Hi-De-Hi! as Squadron Leader Clive Dempster as Emmet Hawksworth in Keeping Up Appearances. Green would become a visible character actor in both the United Kingdom and the United States, most notably, in the series Holby City.

Quick Before They Catch Us heavily influenced Gerry Anderson's 1970s television series The Protectors. The series was never commercially released on home video and no longer exists in the BBC archives, a victim of the BBC's wiping practices.

Characters
Kate (Pamela Franklin) - the youngest of the three, she is a typical carefree teenage girl who has unconventional tastes in clothes and pets. She works part-time in a local café while waiting to go to art school.
Johnny Martin (Teddy Green) - a technological student, Johnny works part-time in a nearby garage also waiting to attend school. He has an exceptional skill for electronics and has, for example, assembled a fully working walkie-talkie from a box of assorted wires, plugs and transistors.
Mark Dennison (David Griffin) - son of a well-known photographer, Mark also intends to become a photographer as well. He is extremely intelligent and well-read with an encyclopaedic knowledge on a wide number of subjects. He is often referred to in the series as the "brains" of the operation.
Don (Colin Bell) -

Episodes

References

Further reading
Butler, David. Time and Relative Dissertations in Space: Critical Perspectives on Doctor Who. Manchester: Manchester University Press, 2007. 
Docherty, Mark J. and Alistair D. McGown. The Hill and Beyond: Children's Television Drama - An Encyclopedia. London: British Film Institute, 2003. 
Parish, James Robert. Film Actors Guide: Western Europe. Metuchen, New Jersey and London: Scarecrow Press, 1977.

External links

1966 British television series debuts
1966 British television series endings
1960s British children's television series
Television shows set in London
Black-and-white British television shows
English-language television shows
Films scored by Monty Norman